Bhabua Assembly constituency is one of 243 constituencies of legislative assembly of Bihar. It comes under Sasaram Lok Sabha constituency.

Overview
Bhabua comprises Community Blocks of Bhabua & Rampur.

Members of Legislative Assembly

Election results

2020

See also
 List of constituencies of Bihar Legislative Assembly

References

External links
 

Politics of Kaimur district
Assembly constituencies of Bihar